The Women's 15 kilometre pursuit cross-country skiing competition at the 2006 Winter Olympics in Turin, Italy was held on 12 February, at Pragelato.

Yuliya Chepalova was the reigning World Champion in the event, while Canadian Beckie Scott won the 10 km pursuit at the 2002 Olympics. However, neither were in the medals here; Kristina Šmigun and Kateřina Neumannová were neck-and-neck coming into the stadium, but Šmigun was the quickest through the last straight and won by 1.9 seconds. Russia's Yevgeniya Medvedeva-Arbuzova took bronze.

In 2014, the Estonian Olympic Committee was notified by the IOC that one of Šmigun's samples from the 2006 Turin Games had been retested with a positive result. On 24 October 2016, the World Anti-Doping Agency Athletes' Commission stated that Šmigun faces a Court of Arbitration for Sport hearing before the end of October. If Šmigun were to be stripped of her gold, Kateřina Neumannová of Czech Republic could be elevated to gold in the 15 km pursuit event.

Results
The pursuit consisted of a 7.5 kilometre section raced in the classical style, followed by a 7.5 kilometre portion raced freestyle. In between, the sections, each skier took time (approximately 30 seconds) to 'pit', changing their skis.

References

Women's cross-country skiing at the 2006 Winter Olympics
Women's pursuit cross-country skiing at the Winter Olympics